Bogdan or Bohdan (Cyrillic: Богдан) is a Slavic masculine name that appears in all Slavic countries as well as Romania and Moldova. It is derived from the Slavic words Bog/Boh (Cyrillic: Бог), meaning "god", and dan (Cyrillic: дан), meaning "given".  The name appears to be an early calque from Greek Theodore (Theodotus, Theodosius) with the same meaning. The name is also used as a surname. Bogdana is the feminine version of the name.

Variations 
The sound change of 'g' into 'h' occurred in the Ukrainian, Belarusian, Czech and Slovak languages (hence Bohdan). Although this sound change did not occur in the Polish language, either Bogdan or Bohdan may be used in Poland.

Slavic variants include Bulgarian and Serbo-Croatian Božidar (Божидар) and Polish Bożydar, while diminutive forms and nicknames include Boguś, Bodya, Boca, Boci, Boća, Boša, Bogi. The feminine form is Bogdana or Bohdana, with variants such as Bogdanka.

Names with similar meanings are Greek Theodore, Arabic Ataullah, Hebrew Nathaniel, Jonathan, and Matthew, Latin Deodatus, French Dieudonné and Bangla Devdutta.

Name days 
 Bulgarian: 6 January
 Croatian: 12 May 
 Czech: 9 November
 Hungarian: 2 September
 Polish: 19 March, 17 July, 10 August or 9 October
 Slovak: 21 December
 Moldovian: 19 October

Given name

Medieval 
Bogdan of Hum (died 1252), Serbian Prince of Hum (fl. –1249)
Bogdan II of Hum, Serbian Prince of Hum (fl. 1312)
 Bogdan (magnate), a Macedonian magnate confused with Vratko Nemanjić as a hero of Serbian epic poetry.
Bogdan I of Moldavia, Voivode of Moldavia (r. 1359–1365), and the House of Bogdan-Muşat (Bogdania was an early name for the principality of Moldavia, named after Bogdan I)
Bogdan Kirizmić (fl. 1361–1371), Serbian financial manager in the service of Vukašin Mrnjavčević (fl. 1371)
Bogdan (fl. 1363), kaznac in the service of Emperor Uroš V
Bogdan (fl. 1407–1413), Serbian state financial manager under Despot Stefan Lazarević, merchant from Prizren and donator to Kalenić monastery
Bogdan (fl. 1407), Serbian logothete in the service of Despot Stefan
Bogdan, Serbian chancellor in the service of Despot Đurađ Branković (r. 1427–1456)
Bogdan II of Moldavia, Voivode of Moldavia (r. 1449–1451)
Bogdan (fl. 1469), Bulgarian nobleman from Nikopol
Bogdan III the One-Eyed, Voivode of Moldavia (r. 1504–1517)
Bohdan Khmelnytsky, Hetman of Ukraine (r. 1648–1657)

Modern 
Bogdan Aldea, Romanian footballer
Bogdan Andone, Romanian footballer
Bogdan Apostu, Romanian footballer
Bogdan Baltazar, Romanian banker
Bogdan Bălan, Romanian rugby union player
Bogdan Bogdanović (architect), Serbian architect
Bogdan Bogdanović (basketball), Serbian basketball player
Bogdan Borusewicz, Polish politician
Bogdan Bucurică, Romanian footballer
Bogdan Buhuș, Romanian footballer
Bohdan Bułakowski, Polish race walker
Bogdan Burtea, Romanian scholar
Bogdan Cistean, Romanian footballer
Bogdan Ciufulescu, Romanian wrestler
Bogdan Ciupek, 2022 missile explosion in Poland victim
Bogdan Cotolan, Romanian footballer
Bogdan Curta, Romanian folk singer
Mihai Bogdan Dobrescu, Romanian boxer
Bogdan Diklić, Serbian actor
Bogdan Filov, Bulgarian archaeologist and politician
Bogdan Gavrilović, Serbian mathematician
Bogdan Juratoni, Romanian footballer
Bogdan Lalić, Croatian chess Grandmaster
Bohdan Lepky, Ukrainian writer
Bogdan Lobonţ, Romanian footballer
Bohdan Łazuka, Polish actor
Bogdan Mandić, Croat Roman Catholic priest
Bogdan Maglich, American physicist
Bogdan Musiał, Polish-German historian
Bogdan Niculescu-Duvăz, Romanian politician
Bogdan Olteanu, Romanian politician
Bogdan Pătrașcu, Romanian footballer
Bogdan Petriceicu Hasdeu, Romanian historian, philologist and politician
Bogdan Planić, Serbian footballer
Bohdan Pomahač, Czech plastic surgeon
Bogdan Raczynski, Polish electronic musician
Bogdan Stelea, Romanian footballer
Bogdan Stoica, Romanian kickboxer
Bogdan Tanjević, Montenegrin basketball coach
Bogdan Tirnanić, Serbian journalist and essayists
Bogdan Ilić, Serbian YouTuber, rapper, gamer and entertainer
Bohdan Tůma, Czech actor and voice actor
Bohdan Sláma, Czech director
Bohdan Stupka, Ukrainian actor
Bohdan Ulihrach, Czech tennis player
Bohdan Warchal, Slovak violinist and dirigent
Bogdan Zimonjić, Serbian priest and military commander

Surname

The surname Bogdan is one of the most common surnames in the Sisak-Moslavina County of Croatia.

It may refer to:

Ádám Bogdán, Hungarian goalkeeper
Ana Bogdan, Romanian tennis player
Angela Bogdan, Canadian diplomat
Christopher Bogdan, United States Air Force general
George Bogdan, Romanian physician
Goran Bogdan, Croatian actor
Henry Bogdan, American bassist and musician
Jakub Bogdan, Slovak painter
Rareș Bogdan, Romanian politician
Srećko Bogdan, Croatian footballer
Zvonko Bogdan, Serbian composer and singer
Pjetër Bogdani, Albanian writer and archbishop of Skopje
Erjon Bogdani, Albanian footballer 
Mihai Eftimie Bogdan, Romanian evangelist

See also
Bogdanski
Bogdani, surname meaning son of Bogdan
Bogdanov, surname meaning son of Bogdan
Bogdanovich (Bogdanović), surname meaning son of Bogdan
Bogusław (given name)
Slavic names

References

Slavic masculine given names
Belarusian masculine given names
Bosnian masculine given names
Bulgarian masculine given names
Croatian masculine given names
Macedonian masculine given names
Montenegrin masculine given names
Polish masculine given names
Romanian masculine given names
Russian masculine given names
Serbian masculine given names
Czech masculine given names
Slovak masculine given names
Slovene masculine given names
Ukrainian masculine given names
Surnames
Romanian-language surnames
Theophoric names